Los Yonic's (or Los Yonics) are a Mexican Grupero band formed in 1975.

Los Yonic's began playing together in San Luis San Pedro but later moved to Acapulco, playing both tropical pop music and ballads. Their music became very popular among American Hispanics in cities such as Los Angeles, San Jose, Phoenix, Arizona, and El Paso. They had a string of #1 albums on the Billboard Regional Mexican charts in the 1980s, and have continued to enjoy chart success on the American market since.
José Manuel Zamacona, founder and lead singer of the band, died of complications from Covid-19 on July 4, 2021, after being hospitalized since May 27 of that year.

Members
Johnny Ayvar "El Compa" - drums, musical director
Jose Manuel Zamacona "DEP"- lead vocals, guitar
Martin Serrano "Carnal"- piano - bass
Bruno Ayvar "El Tripas"- bass
Oscar Perez "El Chino"- keyboards
Eduardo Rincón  "El Soplon"- saxophone, flute
Francisco Hernandez "El Soplon 2"- saxophone, flute
Jose Santos Moreno "Jalador"- guitar
Rodolfo Luviano "El Pilon"- Piano

Discography

Albums

Que lo Sepa el Mundo (1975)

 Caminos Diferentes
 El Carretón
 El Cerrajero
 El Tiburón Coscolino
 Jugueteando con María
 Lindo Sueño
 Mi Castigo
 Que lo Sepa el Mundo
 Tendrás un Altar
 Tu Amor No Me Interesa

So Yo (1976)

 Soy Yo
 A Tu Recuerdo
 Perla
 El Bobo de la Yuca
 Y Así Quedé
 El Tamarindo
 Así Te Quiero
 Dime Dicen Diles
 El Botoncito

Tres Tristes Tigres (1978)

 Tres Tristes Tigres
 Ya No Llores Corazón
 Blanca Estela
 Triste Despedida
 La Vida del Campesino
 Volveré Porque Te Quiero
 Bongo y Tequila
 Oh Humanidad
 La Picosita
 Virgen

El Fantasma (1979)

 Pobres Niños
 Agüita de Cu
 Cada Cosa
 Paloma sin Nido
 Te Vas a Casar
 El Fantasma
 El Carrizal
 Puerto de Ilusión
 No Te Confundas
 Amor Fracasado

Sólo Baladas (1980)

 Muchacha Mágica
 Me Gustas Como Eres
 Tu, Yo y Nuestro Amor
 Amor Extraño
 Quiero Despertar
 Palabras Tristes
 Con el Alma en la Mano
 Me Falta Tu Presencia
 Desde Hoy
 Que Sea lo que Será

Le Falta Un Clavo a Mi Cruz (1981)

 Le Falta Un Clavo a Mi Cruz
 Cosas
 El Pechugón
 China de los Ojos Negros
 Regresa
 El Atarantado
 La Negra Interesada
 La Venus de Oro
 El Último Rodeo

En Su Punto (1982)

 Rosas Blancas
 Dónde
 Ámame y Después Tú Sabrás
 Nuestra Entrega
 Te Quiero Cada Día Más
 Chaqui (New Kid In Town)
 Un Día Más
 Marisela
 Esperando Tu Regreso
 Ya Se Fué

Con Amor (1983)

 Y Te Amo
 Somos Ajenos
 Dime con Quién
 ¿Dónde Estás?
 Te Dí
 En la Estación
 Pero No Me Engañes
 Entrégate
 Mi Canción (Te Dedico Esta Canción)
 Ni Tu Amigo Ni Tu Amante

Pero No Me Dejes (1984)

 Títere
 Si Tú Quisieras
 La Pochita
 Siempre Aventura
 Te Vas a Casar
 Aléjate
 Cariño Compartido
 He Nacido Para Tí
 Herido de Muerte
 Pero No Me Dejes

Déjame Vivír (1985)
  
 Déjame Vivír
 Amiga Casualidad
 Nadie Sabe lo que Tiene
 Dime Amorcito Por Qué
 Sabes Que Te Quiero
 Porque Te Quiero
 Díganle
 Un Dolor
 La Codorníz
 Castillos

Corazón Vacío (1986)

 Adilene
 Corazón Vacío
 Mejor Me Regreso
 Dile que Cante
 Aunque No lo Creas
 Lástima de Amor
 Que Más Da
 El Botoncito
 Ahora Sé
 Necio Corazón

Reissued 1997 as Aunque No lo Creas on Econolinea, eliminating "El Botoncito", replaced with "En Esta Navidad".

Pétalo y Espinas (1987)

 Obligado Por Amor
 Si No Me Querías
 Tu Príncipe Azul
 Abrázame
 Pétalo y Espinas
 Quinceañera
 Veneno Pa' Mi Dolor
 Te Vino Grande la Corona
 La Güera Salió Güero
 Frágil Como el Cristal

Siempre Te Amaré (1988)
            
 Tu Presa Fácil
 No Me Dejes Solo
 Falsas Promesas
 Lo Bonito del Amor
 Siempre Te Amaré
 Olvídame
 Inolvidable Amor
 El Conquistador
 Perdón Por Tus Lágrimas
 Me Haces Falta

A Tu Recuerdo (1989)

 Acábame de Matar
 Dónde Quedó el Amor
 Vuelve
 No le Digas
 A Tu Recuerdo
 Triste Desengaño
 Inesperado Adiós
 Frente a Frente
 Se Hubiera Ido Sola
 Muchacha Bonita

15 Aniversario (1990)

Special album or remastered songs and re-recordings with cuerda real and orchestra
 Que lo Sepa el Mundo
 Volveré Porque Te Quiero
 Soy Yo
 Así Te Quiero
 Me Gustas Como Eres
 Palabras Tristes
 Con el Alma en la Mano
 Rosas Blancas
 Un Dolor
 Y Te Amo
 Nadie Sabe lo que Tiene
 Títere
 Corazón Vacío
 Pétalo y Espinas
 Tu Presa Fácil
 Frente a Frente

¿Por Qué Volví Contigo? (1991)

 ¿Por Qué Volví Contigo?
 Ella No es Culpable
 Juan el Cartero
 ¿Qué Hago Yo?
 Luz de un Solo Instante
 Perdón Mi Dios
 Recordando Mi Canción
 Las Baileras
 Triste Nostalgia
 Mírate al Espejo

Volveré A Conquistarte (1992)

 Pero Te Vas a Arrepentír (a dúo con Marco Antonio Solís)
 Lágrimas Frente Al Mar
 Corazón Prohibido
 De Puntitas
 Volveré A Conquistarte
 Abranme Que Vengo Herido
 Te Llamo Para Despedirme
 Veneno
 Si Pudiera Cambiar de Corazón
 Viejos Recuerdos

Siempre Te Recordaré (1993)
    
 Dime
 Aunque Sé Perder
 Esclavo de Tu Amor
 Siempre Te Recordaré
 Contigo
 Es Mejor Para los Dos (featuring Ana Bárbara)
 Mentiras
 El Albañil
 A Quién le Puedo Contar
 Cuando los Hombres Lloran

Enamorados (1994)

 No Más Boleros
 Hoy Despierta Un Corazón
 Eres
 Quisiera Amarte Menos
 Sin Tí
 Enamorado
 Arrepentido Estoy
 Eres Todo Para Mí
 Por Primera Vez Soy Fiel
 Te Vas Amor
 Llora Conmigo

Mal Herido (1995)

 Perdóname
 ¿Cómo Dejar de Amarte?
 Me Dejó Plantado
 Entre Lilas y Rosas
 Mal Herido
 ¿Cómo Decirle?
 A Punto de Llorar
 Más Vale Solo
 Fruto del Árbol Prohibido
 Tu Juguete

Quien Lo Diria (1996)
 
 Quien Lo Diria
 Una Lágrima
 Eres Mía
 Mi Niña Mimada
 En Pausa
 Un Mundo de Risas Y Sueños
 Tu Cobardía
 Has Vuelto Abrir La Herida
 Siénteme
 Tu No Tienes La Culpa
 Que Nos Paso
 Solo

No Me Cortes Las Alas (1997)

 No Me Cortes Las Alas
 Lo Que No Es Mio
 Rondando Tu Esquina
 Mujeres
 Una Propuesta de Amor
 Porqué No Estás Conmigo
 Locamente Enamorado
 Silvia
 Mi Mayor Deseo
 Amigos No

Nuestras Consentidas y Tú... Con Mariachi (1998)
              
 Adiós Adiós, Amor
 Candilejas
 Yo Te Amo
 Lo Que Te Queda
 Será Mejor que te Vayas
 Corazón Mágico
 Ella ya Me Olidó
 Para Que No Me Olvides
 Espumas
 Brindo Por Tu Compleaños

Me Acordé de Tí (2000)
              
 ¿Y Cómo Fué?
 La Ingratitud
 El Corazón Me Está Doliendo
 No Me Mientas
 Cama Tibia
 Los Cuernos (featuring José Guadalupe Esparza)
 Me Acordé de Ti
 Señor del Universo
 El Último en Saberlo
 Me Estoy Volviendo Loco

Viajero del Amor (2001)
 
 Como las Violetas (Como le Viole)
 La Distancia es Como el Viento
 Me Enamoro de Ti (M' Innamoro di Te)
 El Mundo (Il Mondo)
 Será Porque Te Amo (Sara Perche Ti Amo)
 De Rodillas (In Ginocchio Date)
 Mamma María
 Cómo Has Hecho (Como Hai Fatto)
 Cuerpo Sin Alma (Bella Senz'anima)
 Que Me Importa del Mundo (Che M' Importa del Mondo)

Como Amigos (Los Yonic's álbum) (2002)

 Como Amigos (featuring José Manuel Zamacona Jr.)
 Regresa Con Tu Amor
 Y Por Primera Vez
 En Cada Segundo
 Quién
 Se Renta Está Casa
 Aún Le Llevo Rosas
 Por Jugar Con el Amor
 Que Nos Dejen Vive
 Llorando A Carcajadas
 Sobredosis
 Tonto

Sueños (Los Yonic's album) (2003)

 La Que Me Hizo Llorar
 En Un Hilo
 Nadie Como Tú
 Sueños
 Ni La Busco, Ni Vuelvo
 Amor Perdoname
 El Que Busca Encuentra
 Entre Pobres
 No Pude Decirle Que No
 Es Mi Amor Secreto

Inmune A Nada (Los Yonic's álbum) (2013)

 Y Cuando Estés Con Él
 En Pausa
 Me Partiste el Alma
 Regalo de Amor
 Doy Todo Por Tenerte
 Sí Como No
 Para Olvidar Que Me Olvidas
 Pero Nunca Se lo Digas
 Inmune A Nada
 Y Así Quedé (sings José Manuel Zamacona Jr.)
 Y Cuando Estés Con Él (Pop Version)
 Palabras Tristes (2013 Version)

References

External Links
 
 

1975 establishments in Mexico
2021 disestablishments in Mexico
Mexican musical groups
Mexican pop music groups
Fonovisa Records artists
Grupera music groups
Musical groups established in 1975
Musical groups disestablished in 2021